Way Down East is a 1920 film directed by D. W. Griffiths and starring Lilian Gish.

Way Down East may also refer to:

 Way Down East (1935 film), directed by Henry King
 Way Down East (play), of 1898 by Charlotte Blair Parker

See also
 Down East (disambiguation)